American Guerrilla in the Philippines (released as I Shall Return in the UK) is a 1950 American war film directed by Fritz Lang and starring Tyrone Power as a U.S. Navy ensign stranded by the Japanese occupation of the Philippines in World War II. Based on the 1945 book of the same name by Ira Wolfert, it was filmed on location.

Plot
In April 1942 in the Philippines, an American motor torpedo boat is destroyed by Japanese planes. The survivors, among them Ensign Chuck Palmer (Tyrone Power), make their way ashore on Cebu. Their commander orders them to split up. Chuck pairs up with Jim Mitchell (Tom Ewell) and reaches Colonel Benson on Leyte, only to be told that he has been ordered by General Douglas MacArthur to surrender his forces soon.

Chuck helps Jeanne Martinez (Micheline Presle), a Frenchwoman married to a Filipino planter, get medical assistance for a pregnant woman. Jeanne pleads with Chuck to stay and fight, but he buys an outrigger canoe and recruits a crew of Air Corps soldiers in a desperate, but unsuccessful attempt to sail to Australia. When the boat founders, the crew is rescued by Miguel (Tommy Cook), a member of the Filipino resistance. The Americans evade capture and Chuck eventually meets Jeanne again, as well as her husband Juan (Juan Torena), a secret supporter of the resistance movement.

Chuck is ordered to stay in the Philippines to help set up a stay behind network to gather intelligence on the Japanese. Later, Juan is beaten to death in front of Jeanne in an attempt to find out where the guerrillas are hiding out. Jeanne joins the resistance and is reunited with Chuck at Christmas 1943. They begin to fall in love.

After three years of fighting, Chuck, Jeanne, Jim and the rest of their band are trapped in a church by a Japanese patrol. Just when it looks as if they will be wiped out, squadrons of American planes appear overhead and explosions are heard, announcing the liberation of the Philippines is underway. The Japanese leave to face this greater threat.

Cast
Tyrone Power as Ensign Chuck Palmer
Micheline Presle as Jeanne Martinez (as Micheline Prelle)
Tom Ewell as Jim Mitchell
Robert Patten as Lovejoy (as Bob Patten)
Tommy Cook as Miguel
Juan Torena as Juan Martinez
Jack Elam as The Speaker
Robert Barrat as General Douglas MacArthur

Production
US Navy Ensign Iliff "Rich" Richardson was the executive officer of PT 34. After its sinking by the Japanese, Richardson and a dozen fellow Americans attempted to sail a native outrigger to Australia, but the boat was sunk in a storm. He eventually joined the Philippine guerrilla forces, setting up a radio network to keep the various bands in touch with each other and Allied forces in Australia. After the liberation of the Philippines, Richardson dictated his memoirs to war correspondent Ira Wolfert, who published them in 1945 as An American Guerilla in the Philippines. The book became a Book-of-the-Month Club selection and was published in condensed form in the March 1945 issue of Reader's Digest.

Darryl F. Zanuck of 20th Century Fox bought the film rights and had Lamar Trotti write a screenplay by August 1945. Original plans were to film the movie in Puerto Rico with Fred MacMurray and William Bendix to be directed by Henry King, but later plans were to star John Payne and Linda Darnell to be filmed on Catalina Island. The end of the war led Zanuck to shelve all films with a World War II theme.

In 1950, American Guerrilla in the Philippines was the first American film made on location in the Philippines in color.  Fritz Lang was assigned the project, but said it was the least favorite of all his films. Though the story was well received in the Philippines, there was a protest that Filipino actors were left out of the credits, with the studio placing their names later.  Zanuck, who also worked on the script and edited it,  rushed the film's completion to tie in with the start of the Korean War.

Preservation
The Academy Film Archive preserved American Guerrilla in the Philippines in 2001.

References

External links

1950 films
1950 war films
20th Century Fox films
Pacific War films
Films directed by Fritz Lang
Films set in the Philippines
Japanese occupation of the Philippines films
American World War II films
Films with screenplays by Lamar Trotti
Films shot in the Philippines
Films scored by Cyril J. Mockridge
Films based on non-fiction books
American war films
1950s English-language films
1950s American films
Cultural depictions of Douglas MacArthur